Red mercury is a hoax substance of uncertain composition purportedly used in the creation of nuclear bombs.

Red mercury may also refer to:

 Red Mercury (newspaper stamp), an Austrian postage stamp
 Red Mercury (film), a film produced in the United Kingdom, first released in 2005
 Cinnabar, the bright scarlet to brick-red form of mercury(II) sulfide

See also
 Shadow Ops: Red Mercury, a video game